The 1960 Liège–Bastogne–Liège was the 46th edition of the Liège–Bastogne–Liège cycle race and was held on 8 May 1960. The race started and finished in Liège. The race was won by Albertus Geldermans of the Radium team.

General classification

References

1960
1960 in Belgian sport
1960 Super Prestige Pernod